Musicema Awards is an Iranian annual music awards ceremony based in Tehran, Iran.

The ceremony was founded by the news and analytics website of Musicema, and is supported by the Music Office of the Ministry of Ershad. It has been taking place annually since 2013, held at the Roudaki Hall of Tehran.

Annually, the officially sanctioned musical activities of the country are examined in two stages—the jury's review and the popular choice—and the winners are awarded a copy of a golden statuette that is the symbol of the ceremony.

Several music genres are considered at the ceremony, including pop music, rock music, Iranian classical and regional music, western classical music, fusion and experimental music, and world music.

Awards
Best Song of the Year
Best Album of the Year
Best Single of the Year
Best Songwriter of the Year
Best Composer of the Year
Best Arranger of the Year
Best Producer of the Year
Best Album Cover Design of the Year
Bestselling Album of the Year
Best Publisher of the Year
Best Concert Organization of the Year

See also
National Festival of Youth Music
Fajr International Music Festival

References

Music festivals in Iran